Ven conmigo (English: Come with Me) is a Mexican telenovela produced by Irene Sabido for Televisión Independiente de México in 1975.

Cast 
Silvia Derbez as Caridad Escobar
Jaime Fernández as Arturo Fernandez del Valle
Aaron Hérnan as Carlos
Alma Muriel as Barbara
Juan Ferrara as Guillermo
July Furlong as Vicky
Rosario Gálvez as Laura
Amparo Arozamena as Eulogia
María Rojo as Angelica Gutierrez
Jaime Moreno as Antonio
Juan Pelaez as Jorge
Pedro Armendáriz Jr as Eduardo

Relevance 
The show promoted adult "literacy"; enrollment in such classes jumped ninefold.

References

External links 

Mexican telenovelas
1975 telenovelas
Televisa telenovelas
Spanish-language telenovelas
1975 Mexican television series debuts
1975 Mexican television series endings